Monalisa Gomes Perrone (born 12 November 1969) is a Brazilian journalist. She is a former reporter and presenter for TV Globo, and is an anchor for a TV news program in primetime in the pay television broadcaster CNN Brazil.

Biography
Monalisa graduated from the Pontifícia Universidade Católica de São Paulo. Their parents were high school teachers. During her studies, she worked as a clerk in a rental car company to pay for her college tuition. She began working for radio Jovem Pan in 1992. After three years at that radio network, Monalisa joined Radio Bandeirantes as a reporter. Since March 1999, she works for Globo where she has been working as operations manager and as a journalist.

Between the 4 January 4and the 16 March 010, Monalisa was the temporary presenter of Bom Dia São Paulo, as its main anchor, Mariana Godoy, was on vacation. At that same year she received the award  for Best Female Press reporter in Brazil. She was married, now divorced since 2014,  and has 3 daughters. On October 31, 2011, in a live link that made the Jornal Hoje, she was pushed by members of Merd TV group, which are anti-Globo, what  made the station to  change their  reporting rules of working.

In 2014, she hosted the parades of samba schools of São Paulo and at the end of this year, Monalisa become the first presenter of the new TV news live program Hora Um da Notícia on Rede Globo, which is aired at 5:00am local time ever since.

On 3 August 2019, Perrone left Rede Globo to accept "an irrefusable offer" made by CNN Brazil.

TV news
 Hora Um da Notícia (2014 - 2019)
 Expresso CNN (2020 - 2022)
 Jornal da CNN (2022 - presente)

Presenter eventual
 SPTV (2004 – 2014);
 Bom Dia São Paulo and Bom Dia Brasil (2006 – 2014);
 Jornal Hoje: Sala de Emprego (2012 – 2014)
 Jornal Hoje (2015 - 2016)
 Jornal Nacional (2016 - 2019)

References

People from São Paulo
1969 births
Living people
Pontifical Catholic University of São Paulo alumni
Brazilian people of German descent
Brazilian people of Italian descent
Brazilian television news anchors
Brazilian women journalists
Brazilian journalists
Women television journalists
Brazilian women television presenters